Odd Fellows Rest is the fifth album by American sludge metal band Crowbar, released on July 7, 1998 via Mayhem Records. It was re-released on August 24, 1999 via Spitfire Records, featuring a bonus track.

The song "Planets Collide" has become a mandatory staple on Crowbar's live setlists. The album was inducted into Decibel Magazine’s Hall of Fame in June of 2017.

Track listing

Personnel

Crowbar
Kirk Windstein – lead vocals, rhythm guitar
Sammy Pierre Duet – lead guitar, backing vocals
Todd Strange – bass
Jimmy Bower (a.k.a. "Wicked Cricket") – drums

Additional musicians
Big Mike The Testices – additional backing vocals
Ross Karpelman – keyboards, piano, organ
Sid Montz – additional percussion

Production
Arranged by Crowbar
Produced by Crowbar and Keith Falgout
Recorded, engineered and mixed by Keith Falgout (vocals, guitars, bass guitar, keyboards) and David Ferrel (drums, percussion)

References

1998 albums
Crowbar (American band) albums